Friesella is a genus of bees belonging to the family Apidae.

The species of this genus are found in Southern America.

Species:
 Friesella schrottkyi (Friese, 1900)

References

Apidae